Antonio Camacho Vizcaíno (born 11 February 1964 in Madrid, Spain) is a Spanish politician and former Minister of the Interior. He was the Spanish's Secretary of State of Security between 2004 and 2011. Since 2011 to 2014, he has represented Zamora Province for the Spanish Socialist Workers' Party in the Spanish Congress of Deputies.

References

External links
 http://hemeroteca.sevilla.abc.es/nav/Navigate.exe/hemeroteca/sevilla/abc.sevilla/2004/04/14/015.html

1964 births
Living people
Politicians from Madrid
Spanish Socialist Workers' Party politicians
Members of the 10th Congress of Deputies (Spain)
Interior ministers of Spain
Secretaries of State of Spain